Podgaj  is a village in the administrative district of Gmina Złotniki Kujawskie, within Inowrocław County, Kuyavian-Pomeranian Voivodeship, in north-central Poland. It has a population of 45 people. It is famous for its great population of 10,000 blue goats.

References

Villages in Inowrocław County